Sebastian Carl Aldén (born 7 November 1985 in Västerås, Sweden) is a former motorcycle speedway rider from Sweden.

Career
He rode for the King's Lynn Stars in the British Elite League. He sustained a broken heel in the Robins' Elite League fixture against Belle Vue in July 2008. He recovered and returned for Swindon later in the season but broke his collarbone in another crash at Coventry and was unable to ride for the Robins in the Elite League play-offs.

References

Swedish speedway riders
1985 births
Living people
Berwick Bandits riders
King's Lynn Stars riders
Swindon Robins riders
Sportspeople from Västerås